This is a list of Carnegie libraries in Oceania. Although most of Carnegie's philanthropic efforts were aimed at North America and Europe, a handful of libraries are scattered in other English-speaking areas of the world. New Zealand, with 18 Carnegie libraries, received the fourth-most libraries of any country.

Australia
Carnegie financed four libraries in Australia.

Fiji
There is a Carnegie library in Suva, Fiji's capital, funded by the philanthropist with a $7,300 grant ($ today) on 13 December 1907.

Malaysia 
There was a Carnegie library in Kota Bharu. The library is now called Kelantan Public Library Corporation.

Mauritius 
There is a Carnegie library in Curepipe.

New Zealand

The money for Carnegie libraries in the Dominions (the contemporary term used for former colonies such as Australia, New Zealand and South Africa within the British Empire) was administered from New York. Twenty-five towns and boroughs applied for funding and eighteen libraries were provided in New Zealand. The country had the fourth-highest number of Carnegie libraries, behind the USA, the UK and Canada:

Notes

References

Libraries
Oceania
Carnegie libraries
Libraries in New Zealand
Libraries in Fiji
Libraries in Australia